Rachel Roarx (born March 3, 1997) is an American politician who serves in the Kentucky House of Representatives from the 38th district since January 1, 2023.

References 

1997 births
Living people
Democratic Party members of the Kentucky House of Representatives
21st-century American politicians
21st-century American women politicians
Women state legislators in Kentucky